Głodno may refer to the following places:
Głodno, Grodzisk Wielkopolski County in Greater Poland Voivodeship (west-central Poland)
Głodno, Konin County in Greater Poland Voivodeship (west-central Poland)
Głodno, Lublin Voivodeship (east Poland)